The Lords of Discipline is a 1980 novel by Pat Conroy that was later adapted in a 1983 film of the same name.

The story centers on Will McLean, who is in his fourth year at the fictional Carolina Military Institute in Charleston, South Carolina. Will's experiences are heavily based on Pat Conroy’s own experiences at The Citadel, a real military college in Charleston. The story is narrated in first person by Will, who attends the Institute between 1963 and 1967. Will recounts his years at the Institute, especially focusing on the school's brutal culture of hazing and abuse. After discovering a secret society that drives cadets deemed unworthy of graduating from the Institute to drop out by any means necessary, Will and his friends' graduations and lives are threatened.

Background 
Although Conroy drew on his experiences as a cadet at The Citadel, and also references traditions and locations of both Norwich University and VMI, he has said that the story is fiction and not based on his life or that of any other graduate of a military academy. Citadel alumni were critical of the novel, considering it a thinly-veiled and unflattering account of the school, and Conroy was ostracized by his alma mater and effectively banned from campus for over 20 years after its publication. In 2000, The Citadel invited Conroy back to campus to receive an honorary doctorate, and again the next year as commencement speaker.

Plot
Will McLean, returning to the Carolina Military Institute in Charleston, South Carolina, an unknown number of years after his graduation, tells the story of his life at the Institute. In 1966, Will was an English major on a basketball scholarship, in his fourth and final year at the Institute. Will is not interested in a military career, and had only attended on account of his father, also an alumnus, to whom he made a deathbed promise years ago to attend and eventually wear the Institute's graduate ring. He is generally well-liked and his professors and peers recognize him for his integrity and fairness, although he is also sarcastic and independent. Will struggles to fit into the strict military environment, but finds solace in his three roommates, who have become his closest friends: Tradd St. Croix, the son of an upper-class Charlestonian family, and two brawny Italian-American boys from the North, Dante "Pig" Pignetti and Mark Santoro. They all look forward to graduation, although Will's friends will head off to fight in the Vietnam War, which Will is personally against. However, Will does have some pride in the Institute, representing it in basketball. Though anti-war, he also despises the discrimination the Institute faces from civilian students of other colleges due to its military association, which he sees at away games. For example, when Will plays a game against the Virginia Military Institute, which is considered their biggest rival game, he notes that VMI was the only team all season that did not harass him and his teammates. 

Colonel Berrineau, the Commandant of Cadets who is commonly known as The Bear, asks Will to look out for the Institute's first black cadet, Tom Pearce, knowing that Will is the only liberal in the student body. Will also begins a secret relationship with Annie Kate Gervais, a girl from an upper-class Charlestonian family who has become pregnant from a boy who refused to marry her, though their relationship is doomed because Will is Irish-American, Catholic, and not wealthy. Will attempts to help a freshman, Poteete, who is struggling with the plebe system, which is the brutal hazing and abuse experienced by freshmen at the Institute. However, Poteete kills himself.

In an extended flashback, Will then describes his own plebe year three years earlier. Will learns that the only way to survive is to bond closely with the other members of his class against the cadre. Having entered the college on a basketball scholarship, Will is also protected by other members of the basketball team who don't want to see Will physically harmed and, at one point, rescue him from a particularly brutal hazing incident. Many of Will's classmates are not so lucky, and resign from the school due to the unrelenting hazing. However, a recruit named Bobby Bentley who has a problem with urinating on himself due to the stress of hazing but in excellent shape, refuses to quit and can handle all physical hardships. Conventional hazing methods fail to break Bentley, causing Will's freshman class to come together, and making Will's cadre the subject of ridicule of the entire cadet corps. Near the end of the year, Will's freshman class is recognized as cadets, and the hazing ends. Some time before this, Bobby Bentley is taken off campus by an unknown group and withdraws from the Institute the following day for unknown reasons.

Back in Will's senior year, he hears rumors of The Ten, a mysterious Institute secret society that ensures certain cadets, deemed unacceptable to "wear the ring" (that is, to be a graduate of the Institute, denoted by wearing of a class ring), are run out by any means necessary. Will discovers that the Ten are real and are trying to run Pearce out to keep the Institute all white. Meanwhile, Will and the other seniors are given their Institute rings in preparation for graduation, and Will wins the final basketball game of his career.

Annie Kate's baby is stillborn and she rejects Will, wanting to forget all about the time she spent pregnant. Will looks further into the Ten and reunites with Bobby Bentley, who reveals that, during their plebe year, he was spirited away to a house, and was threatened and tortured to the point that he agreed to quit. Bentley says his ultimate decision to quit was not due to the torture, but the realization he no longer wished to be associated with any organization that would have a group like The Ten. Bentley recalls one member of The Ten, whom they piece together as a high-ranking cadet from their plebe year. Will, Mark, and Pig, discovering this Ten member is now a student at a nearby law school, abduct him, then interrogate him on a secluded railroad track until he reveals the location of the house, which is a plantation house owned by General Bentley Durrell, the superintendent of the Institute. When Pearce is kidnapped by the Ten, Will goes to the house but is discovered. He is rescued by Mark and Pig, but their identities are now known by the Ten. 

Pearce is intimidated into silence, and the Ten attempt to have Mark, Pig and Will thrown out of the school. Pig is caught on an honor code violation due to the Ten and loses the honor court case, despite the help of his roommates. After he is expelled and drummed out of school, he throws himself in front of a train, killing himself. The Ten then attempt to get Will and Mark kicked out of school for excess demerits. Just as they are about to be thrown out, Will discovers that Tradd's father was a member of the Ten. He and Mark read his journals and discover the names of all current and former members. They also discover that Tradd is a member of the Ten and had been feeding the Ten information the whole time, and that Tradd is the father of Annie Kate's baby. Will confronts Tradd and ends their friendship. Will then attempts to blackmail the General into letting him and Mark graduate, using the information learned about the Ten, but Durrell refuses, claiming their substandard performance and that the graduate they kidnapped wants to press charges against them as justifications for dismissal. The Bear then enters the General's office, informing him that multiple cadets who were run out of the Institute are now considering lawsuits of their own. General Durrell relents when also faced with the threat of exposure to the press, as evidenced by Mark seen outside with letters containing the information ready to be mailed. Will and Mark are allowed to graduate, but the board of governors removes Colonel Berrineau (The Bear) from his position as commandant. Shortly before graduation, Will receives a letter from Annie Kate, thanking him for standing by her and saying he will make a good husband to whatever woman he finds. Reflecting on his graduation, Will notes that eight of his fellow cadets will eventually be killed in action in the Vietnam War, Mark among them. Will also reveals that The Ten member and class "golden boy" John Alexander would fade into obscurity, last seen working as a ROTC instructor at a small university, while Mark Santoro tops the entire class in awards for valor. As Will receives his diploma from the Institute, he is coldly told by General Durrell not to disgrace the ring, but Will simply replies with "Dante Pignetti", honoring his former roommate and showing his contempt for the general by breaking the school's taboo of ever speaking the name of a drummed-out cadet. The Bear appears at their graduation to congratulate Will. Disgusted at seeing General Durrell's signature on his diploma, Will asks Colonel Berrineau to sign it as Will wants the name of a man he can respect on the diploma. The Bear does not sign, remarking, "there already is, Bubba", pointing to Will's name.

Characters 

Will McLean – The protagonist and narrator, who is heavily based on Pat Conroy in his college years. Will is independent and sarcastic, and, unlike the rest of his classmates, does not wish to join the military after graduation. He is, however, generally well-liked on campus for being fair and kind. The story is told retrospectively some time after his graduation.
Tradd St. Croix – Will's roommate and friend, from a very rich and respected old Charlestonian family. Will was close to him and his parents, Abigail and Commerce St. Croix, but their friendship ends after Will discovers he was a member of the Ten.
Dante "Pig" Pignetti – Will's roommate and friend, and a brawny Italian-American from the North. He comes from a poor family, is prone to violence and is extremely protective of his friends and his fiancée Theresa. He is run out of the Institute by the Ten after they catch him on an honor code violation, driving him to commit suicide.
Mark Santoro – Will's roommate and friend, another Italian-American from the North who is loyal to Will to the end. He dies fighting in Vietnam some time after graduation, with honors for his for valor.
Tom Pearce – The first black student to attend the Institute, whom Will is assigned to watch over and ensure he fairly makes it through his plebe year.
Annie Kate Gervais – A young pregnant woman from an upper-class Charlestonian family that has fallen on hard times whom Will befriends and later falls in love with. Annie Kate struggles with loneliness due to the fact that she must hide her pregnancy after her baby's father refuses to marry her. Annie Kate ends her relationship with Will after her baby is stillborn. She moves to California to attend college and asks Will to not to contact her, but not before confirming to Will that Tradd was the child's father.
General Bentley Durrell – A famous Second World War general and president of the Institute, who is revealed to have been a former member of the Ten and has been protecting the clandestine organization.
Bobby Bentley – Will's fellow classmate who is targeted by upperclassmen due to his wetting himself during his freshman year. His perseverance in the face the brutal hazing he experiences inspires Will's class to come together, but he is ultimately driven out by the Ten.
Colonel "The Bear" Berrineau – The Commandant of the Cadets in charge of maintaining discipline and helping students at the Institute. The character was based on Lieutenant Colonel Thomas "The Boo" Courvoisie, an iconic former Assistant Commandant at The Citadel who was also the subject of Conroy's first book, The Boo.
John "Bucky" Poteete – A freshman mentored by Will who struggles with the brutal hazing at the Institute. He commits suicide after being kidnapped and tortured by the Ten, driving Will into a depression.

Reception 
The novel received generally positive reviews.

Film adaptation

The novel was adapted for the screenplay of a 1983 film of the same name, starring David Keith as Will McLean and Robert Prosky as Colonel "The Bear" Berrineau. The film version took place entirely in McLean's senior year, when he was asked to protect Pearce. Several plot points were changed for the film:

 In the novel, Poteete successfully kills himself by hanging, having earlier being unsuccessful in killing himself jumping off a roof (having been thwarted by Mark and Will). In the film, he is an outcast but not suicidal. He is seen saying he will be accepted if he performs the dangerous stunt of jumping from one rooftop to another. In his attempt to do so, Poteete misses and falls.
 McLean was assigned the duty of protecting Pearce because of McLean's perceived liberalism. In the film, McLean was assigned the duty to repay The Bear for protecting him during his own plebe year.
 After his "walk of shame", Pignetti commits suicide by walking into the path of a speeding train. In the film, he simply gets into a taxicab called for him and is never seen again, and as part of Will's deal with Durrell, Pignetti is to be reinstated at the Institute and allowed to complete his degree.
 Tradd's motivation for joining The Ten is not as well explained in the film, and the novel's entire "Honey Prince" subplot of Tradd's effeminate nature is never depicted. In the film, Tradd admits it was his father also being a member, ensuring him legacy status, and was enthralled with membership in The Ten being the Institute's highest honor, but expresses some remorse over The Ten's activities. The film makes a brief aside to Tradd's lack of manliness, with Commerce commending how Will looks good in uniform whereas Tradd does not seem soldierly "even if he was wearing a suit of armor".
 The entire plotline concerning McLean and Annie Kate Gervais, the mother of his roommate Tradd St Croix's illegitimate—and ultimately stillborn—child, is not in the film.
 In the film, Pearce apologizes for turning his back on McLean, explaining that he did it because of survival, and if he did not make it, "the next nigger has my record around his neck like a rock". In the novel, McLean has no further contact with Pearce after that.
 The novel speaks of the death of General Durrell's son, who Will remembered as an obscure cadet who could not escape his father's shadow. The notification of this death causes the cadets to go to General Durell's house, where his wife requests the cadets in bright anger to "kill Vietcong". In the film, the ring ceremony is interrupted with General Durrell reading a letter of his son being killed in action. Will and the others then hold a candlelight vigil before Mr. and Mrs. Durrell singing Dixie.

References

Fiction set in the 1960s
1980 American novels
American novels adapted into films
Books by Pat Conroy
Charleston, South Carolina in fiction
Houghton Mifflin books
Novels set in South Carolina
Roman à clef novels
The Citadel, The Military College of South Carolina